The 2005 Copa Nextel Stock Car was the 28th Stock Car Brasil season. It began on May 1 at the Interlagos and ended on November 27 at the same circuit, after twelve rounds.

Teams and drivers
All drivers were Brazilian-registered, except Esteban Tuero, who raced under Argentine racing license.

References

External links 
 Stock Car Brasil 2005 standings

Stock Car Brasil
Stock Car Brasil seasons